Alien's Return (also known as Col 'N''', E.T. Go Home and Go Go Home Monster) is a video game released in 1983 by ITT Family Games for the Atari 2600.

Gameplay
An alien crashed on Earth and to get back to his planet he must find the four pieces of his spacecraft. Go into the several rooms and press the button. Hopefully, a piece of the ship will show on a corner of the screen. Pick it up and repeat the procedure until you can go back home. Beware of the guardians, though, as they would follow you to trap you.

European version
The European version of the game was released with the title UFI und sein gefährlicher Einsatz (German title; translated to: "UFI and his dangerous mission"), also known as E.T. Go Home and as E.T. Go Come''.

In popular culture
The game was mocked on an episode of James Rolfe's YouTube series The Angry Video Game Nerd, in which The Nerd (Rolfe) expresses confusion and anger at the game's strange cover art.

References

External links
Alien's Return at Atari Mania

1983 video games
Atari 2600 games
Atari 2600-only games
Maze games
Video games developed in Germany